Ko Kham is a small island near Ko Mak, in Trat Province, Thailand.

See also
 List of islands of Thailand

References

External links

Kham
Geography of Trat province